Robert Charles Geale (born April 17, 1962) is a Canadian retired professional ice hockey centre, who played in one National Hockey League game for the Pittsburgh Penguins during the 1984–85 NHL season.

Career statistics

See also
List of players who played only one game in the NHL

External links

1962 births
Living people
Baltimore Skipjacks players
Canadian ice hockey centres
Ice hockey people from Edmonton
Pittsburgh Penguins draft picks
Pittsburgh Penguins players
Portland Winterhawks players